Albert Poulain (February 6, 1851 – January 6, 1937) was a French chocolatier and industrialist who directed Chocolat Poulain from 1874 to 1893. He was also the first president of the Chamber of commerce of Loir-et-Cher from 1896 to 1920.

See also 
 Victor-Auguste Poulain

References 

French businesspeople
Chocolatiers
Recipients of the Legion of Honour
1851 births
1937 deaths